The 1952 Buffalo Bulls football team was an American football team that represented the University of Buffalo as an independent during the 1952 college football season. In their first season under head coach Fritz Febel, the Bulls compiled a 1–7 record and were outscored by a total of 201 to 59. The team played its home games at Civic Stadium in Buffalo, New York.

Schedule

References

Buffalo Bulls
Buffalo Bulls football seasons
Buffalo Bulls football